Greenbush is an extinct town in Walker County, in the U.S. state of Georgia.

History
A post office called "Green Bush" was established in 1856, and remained in operation until 1927. The community was named for a prominent green bush which grew at the original town site.

References

Geography of Walker County, Georgia
Ghost towns in Georgia (U.S. state)